Christia Visser (born 2 March 1992) is a South African actress and singer. She received a SAFTA nomination for her performance in the film Tess (2016). She began releasing music in 2019. Her debut album Gemaklik Verlore (2020) was nominated for a South African Music Award.

Early life
Visser grew up in Swellendam. Her father is a preacher. After matriculating from Stellenbosch High School, she completed at two year Advanced Acting for Film diploma at Act Cape Town. She also received dance and classical vocal training.

Career
Visser made her professional stage debut in Nicola Hanekom's play Land van Skedels at the 2013 Klein Karoo Nasionale Kunstefees and Aardklop. Her first films were The Perfect Wave and Hollywood in my Huis in 2014, the latter of which earned her a People's Choice award for Best Actress at the kykNET Silwerskermfees, and Ballad for a Loner and Last Ones Out in 2015.

In 2016, Visser played a young Alison Botha in the documentary Alison and the titular role of Tess, a film adaptation of the novel Whiplash by Tracey Farren. For her performance in the latter, Visser was awarded Best Actress at the Durban International Film Festival that year and nominated for Best Actress in a Feature Film at the 2017 South African Film and Television Awards (SAFTAs). From 2016 to 2021, Visser starred as Lillie Human in Die Boekklub, marking her debut television role.

Visser had main roles in the 2018 series Knapsekêrels and Onder die Suiderkruis. She appeared in the Border War film The Recce. She had a recurring role in the second season of Fynskrif before being promoted to series regular for its third season.

Visser began releasing music in 2019, beginning with the singles "17 Shots" and "Die Deur". The music video for "17 Shots" garnered over five million views on YouTube. This was followed by her 2020 debut album Gemaklik Verlore. Its release was accompanied by two more singles: "Kaal Voor Jou" and "Wildste Oomblik". That same year, she hosted Model for SABC 2. Gemaklik Verlore was nominated for Best Pop Album at the 27th South African Music Awards.

In 2021, Visser joined the cast of Binnelanders for its seventeenth season as Yolandi, made a guest appearance in the BBC America adaptation of Terry Pratchett's The Watch, and starred opposite Francois Jacobs in the romantic comedy Kaalgat Karel. She released the singles "Beste Leun Wen" and "Kaapse Blou" in 2021 and "Handgranaat" in 2022.

As of 2022, Visser stars in the English-language M-Net thriller Desert Rose as Ishara, one of the Greyling siblings.

Personal life
Visser married Thomas Webb at Edendale Farm in Bonnievale in June 2021. They have a daughter Kida, born 29 May 2022.

Discography

Albums

Singles

Filmography

Film

Television

Stage

Awards and nominations

References

External links
 
 Christia Visser at TVSA

Living people
1992 births
21st-century South African actresses
21st-century South African women singers
People from Swellendam
South African pop singers